Gavin Noble (born 9 April 1981 in Enniskillen, Co. Fermanagh, Northern Ireland) is a Northern Irish professional triathlete.

Gavin competes mostly in ITU sanctioned races. He represented Northern Ireland at the 2002 & 2006 Commonwealth Games and Ireland in the European Cup and World Cup campaigns. Noble came 23rd in the London 2012 Olympics in the men's triathlon for Ireland.

Results

External links 
 GavinNoble.com - official website

1981 births
Living people
Irish male triathletes
Triathletes at the 2012 Summer Olympics
Olympic triathletes of Ireland
People from Enniskillen
Triathletes at the 2006 Commonwealth Games
Commonwealth Games competitors for Northern Ireland
Sportspeople from County Fermanagh
Triathletes from Northern Ireland